Hermann Höpfner (born 11 September 1945) is a German gymnast. He competed in eight events at the 1968 Summer Olympics.

References

External links
 

1945 births
Living people
German male artistic gymnasts
Olympic gymnasts of West Germany
Gymnasts at the 1968 Summer Olympics
People from Bad Dürkheim
Sportspeople from Rhineland-Palatinate